Tom Clements (born 1953) is an American football coach and former CFL quarterback

Tom Clements may also refer to:

Tom Clements (politician) (born 1951), South Carolina environmental activist and politician
Tom Clements (public official) (1954–2013), head of the Colorado Department of Corrections
Tom Clements (EastEnders), fictional character

See also
Thomas Clements (born 1916), Church of Ireland dignitary